Samantha Aquim is a Brazilian chef, owner of Aquim Gastronomia in Ipanema, Rio de Janeiro and founder of Q-Zero Chocolate.

Early life and education
Samantha Aquim was born and grew up in Rio de Janeiro, Brazil. She graduated Pontifical Catholic University of Rio de Janeiro with a doctorate in Psychology. She then studied in France at the Culinary Institute LeNôtre.

Career

Q-Zero Chocolate
Aquim is the founder of Q-Zero Chocolate, a luxury chocolate made of cocoa from Bahia, Brazil that sells for up to $15,000 a box. In 2012 at The Northwest Chocolate Festival in Seattle, it was named one of the top chocolates in the world.

References

External links
  (Spanish)
 

Pontifical Catholic University of Rio de Janeiro alumni
Living people
Brazilian chefs
21st-century Brazilian businesswomen
21st-century Brazilian businesspeople
Businesspeople from Rio de Janeiro (city)
Year of birth missing (living people)
Chocolatiers